Drillia altispira is a species of sea snail, a marine gastropod mollusk in the family Drilliidae.

Description

Distribution
This species occurs in the demersal zone of the Gulf of Aden at depths between 655 – 732 m.

References

 Tucker, J.K. 2004 Catalog of recent and fossil turrids (Mollusca: Gastropoda). Zootaxa 682:1–1295

External links
 BioLib: Drillia altispira

altispira
Gastropods described in 1996